Barbara Tribe (1913–2000) was an Australian-born artist who spent most of her career in Cornwall. She is regarded as a significant twentieth-century portrait artist, working both in painting and sculpture.

Personal life 
Tribe was born in the suburb of Edgecliff, Sydney to English parents. In 1935 Tribe was awarded a travelling scholarship which allowed her to travel to England, where she lived and worked for the rest of her life. Tribe married John Singleman, an architect and potter, in 1947. They bought the former Baptist Sunday School building (later known as 'The Studio') in Sheffield, Cornwall in 1947 and moved there shortly afterwards.

Education 
Tribe first studied at the Sydney Technical College from 1928 to 1933, joining when she was 15 years old. After travelling to England, Tribe first attended the Kennington City & Guilds School of Art in 1936–1937 before being accepted into the Regent Street Polytechnic School of Art.

Artwork and career 

Tribe's work was heavily influenced by her travel experiences. During her time at the Sydney Technical College, she studied under English born sculptor, Raynor Hoff, and her figure work at this time was heavily influenced by him. After she received her diploma, she worked as Hoff's assistant and worked on the Hyde Park war memorial in Sydney with him. Between 1931 and 1934 Tribe often exhibited with the Society of Artists before holding her first solo show in 1934.

In the mid to late 1930s, Tribe and fellow Australian artist and actor Jean Elwing convinced Selfridges to provide studio space, and the young artist was also given parties by the store.

In 1943, Tribe was commissioned by Australia House, London to produce busts of seven distinguished airmen from Australia. Also in the 1940s, she began exhibiting at the Royal Academy of Arts and the Royal Society of British Sculptors.

Tribe entered a piece titled Embryo into the renowned The Unknown Political Prisoner exhibition (14 March–30 April 1953).

During the Second World War, Tribe worked for the Inspectorate of Ancient Monuments, recording vulnerable historic buildings. Tribe took up a part time teaching post at the Penzance School of Art after the war, and continued to teach there for over 40 years, retiring in 1988. Tribe was a member of Newlyn Society of Artists and St Ives Society of Artists.

Selected awards and commissions 
Tribe received much recognition within her lifetime, including the following,

 Bronze medal for Sculpture, Sydney Technical College, 1933
 New South Wales Travelling Art Scholarship, 1935. Tribe was the first woman to receive this award. 
 Jean Masson Davidson Medal, Society of Portrait Sculptors, London, 1998

Selected exhibitions 
Tribe exhibited widely throughout her career including the following,

 Solo exhibition, Fine Art Gallery (Anthony Horden & Sons), Sydney, 1934
 Summer Exhibition, Royal Academy of Arts, London, 5 May–26 August 1951
 Group Exhibition by the Staff of the Penzance School of Art, Newlyn Art Gallery, July 1982
 Alice to Penzance, the Mall Galleries, London, 19–29 July 1991
 This vital flesh: the sculpture of Rayner Hoff and his school, Art Gallery of New South Wales, Sydney, 26 November 1999–16 Jan 2000
 Australian paintings 1895-2002 and the European influence, Nevill Keating Pictures Ltd., London, July–August 2002
 The Elements within Sculpture, Lauraine Diggins Fine Art, Melbourne, 4 June–15 July 2011

Works held in public collections 
Artwork by Barbara Tribe are held in several public collections, including the following works,

Legacy 
Tribe specified in her will that some of her works were to be sold in aid of setting up the Barbara Tribe Foundation. Administered by the Art Gallery of New South Wales, the aim of the foundation is to promote sculpture in Australia.

An archive relating to Barbara Tribe is held by the National Art Archive at the Art Gallery of New South Wales.

References

External links 

 Article about Barbara Tribe in the Sydney Morning Herald, 1938
 Works by Barbara Tribe on Art UK

1913 births
2000 deaths
St Ives artists
Artists from Sydney
20th-century Australian women artists
Australian women sculptors
People from the Eastern Suburbs (Sydney)
People from Penzance
20th-century Australian sculptors
Australian emigrants to the United Kingdom